Chenareh-ye Latif (also Romanized as Chenāreh-ye Laṭīf) is a village in Jeygaran Rural District, Ozgoleh District, Salas-e Babajani County, Kermanshah Province, Iran. At the 2006 census, its population was 79, in 14 families.

References 

Populated places in Salas-e Babajani County